The Renault Sport Trophy was a one-make racing series created and managed by Renault Sport. The series has raced with the Renault Sport R.S. 01 in 2015 and 2016 as part of the Renault Sport Series (formerly World Series by Renault), but was folded after just two seasons.

Development
In 2014, Renault announced its intention to create a new one-make sports car championship. The company unveiled the racecar for the series, called Renault Sport RS 01, at the 2014 Moscow Motor Show. The RS 01, developed by Renault Sport, has a Gibson Technology-tuned 3.8-litre V6 twin-turbo engine supplied by Renault Sport's Japanese partner Nismo and a chassis built by Dallara. It was announced that the championship would use a professional-gentleman drivers combination.  The first season was held in 2015. The second and the last season was held in 2016, as a support event for 2016 European Le Mans Series.

Drivers and race format

The car is driven by a professional-gentleman driver combination. Professional drivers compete for the Elite (or PRO) class championship and gentlemen for the Prestige (or AM) class. , the race weekend consists of one 60-minute/90-minute (plus one lap) race called "endurance", where the two drivers of each car participate, and two 25-minute races (one for the Elite-class driver and other for the Prestige-class driver). There are separate qualifying sessions for Elite and Prestige to determine the grid order in the short races, and the endurance grid order is determined by a system that uses a mix of Elite and Prestige qualifying results.

Awards
 the Renault Sport Trophy Elite-class champion is given a development programme and the chance to participate at a Nismo's Super GT test. If he is not chosen to compete in Super GT, he receives a  award. The Prestige-class driver can opt between a  award to step up into the Elite class or a LMP2 entry at the Le Mans 24 Hours.

Specifications
Engine displacement:  DOHC V6
Gearbox: 7-speed paddle shift gearbox (must have reverse)
Weight: 
Power output: 
Fuel: Elf LMS 101.6 RON Unleaded
Fuel Capacity: 
Fuel Delivery: Fuel injection
Aspiration: Twin-turbocharged
Length: 
Width: 
Wheelbase:  
Steering:  Hydraulic power-assisted rack and pinion

Champions

See also
 Eurocup Mégane Trophy
 Renault Clio Cup

References

External links
 Renault-Sport official website
 Renault Sport Trophy official website

 
Touring car racing series
Recurring sporting events established in 2015
Recurring events disestablished in 2016